Amsar is a rural locality (a selo) and the administrative centre of Amsarsky Selsoviet, Rutulsky District, Republic of Dagestan, Russia. The population was 460 as of 2010. There are 5 streets.

Geography 
Amsar is located 12 km northwest of Rutul (the district's administrative centre) by road. Luchek and Shinaz are the nearest rural localities.

Nationalities 
Rutuls live there.

References 

Rural localities in Rutulsky District